The Autostrada A4, or Serenissima, is a motorway which connects Turin and Trieste via Milan and Venice. The city of Venice (or rather, Mestre which is the "land" part of Venice) originally formed a bottleneck on the A4, but is now bypassed by the Passante di Mestre (the old route through Mestre was renumbered A57). The A4 passes just north of the city of Milan, where it is toll-free.

Due to the different companies that manage the different parts of the motorway, it is often referred to as formed by five sections: Turin-Milan, Milan-Brescia, Brescia-Padua, Padua-Venice and Venice-Trieste. As it runs through the whole Pianura Padana, which is a densely populated and highly industrialized area, A4 is one of the most trafficked motorways of Italy.

A4 is a dual-carriageway, six-lane motorway for most of its length. The stretch between Milano Est tollgate and Bergamo has been an eight-lane motorway since 30 September 2007. The stretch from Venice to Trieste is instead still a four-lane motorway, but it is planned to upgrade this stretch over motorway to six lanes.

Operators
Turin-Milan: SATAP
Milan-Brescia: Autostrade per l'Italia (a subsidiary of Atlantia)
Brescia-Padua: A4 Holding (a subsidiary of Abertis)
Padua-Venice: Concessioni Autostradali Venete (since 2009; ANAS and Veneto Region joint venture)
Venice-Trieste: Autovie Venete

Passante di Mestre

The passante di Mestre is a part of the A4 motorway, opened to traffic on 8 February 2009. The objective of the route is to reduce the volume of auto- and truck-based traffic passing through Mestre (a mainland frazione of Venice) to reach non-local destinations like Austria, Slovenia and other Eastern European countries.

The new includes three lanes plus one emergency lane.

Major Cities
A4 Passes through Turin, Settimo Torinese, Novara, Cusano Milanino, Cinisello Balsamo, Monza, Bergamo, Brescia, Verona,
Vicenza, and Padua.

Junctions

See also
Tangenziale di Milano
Tangenziale di Padova
Tangenziale di Venezia

References

External links
Autostrade per l'Italia website, last accessed on 1 November 2008 
Autostrada Brescia-Padova
Autostrada Padova-Venezia
Autovie Venete
 Official website of the passante di Mestre 

A04
Transport in Piedmont
Transport in Lombardy
Transport in Veneto
Transport in Friuli-Venezia Giulia